Texas History Movies was a "popular racist comic strip that ran in The Dallas Morning News in the late 1920s".  According to the Texas State Historical Association's Handbook of Texas, it was "drawn by Jack Patton, [and] was originally published in book form in 1928. A paperback edition was distributed to Texas school children at no cost".A completely new version by "counter-cultural artist, author, and self-made historian"  Jack Jackson (Jaxon), entitled New Texas History Movies, was published by the Texas State Historical Association in 2007 and won the 2008 Best Western Graphic Novel award from True West Magazine''. It was Jackson's last work before his death in June 2006.

References 
  
 

History books about Texas
Comic strips started in the 1920s